Faculty of Letters and Humanities of the University of Tehran is one of the earliest six faculties of the University of Tehran dating from 1935 when the university was founded. Since 1958 it has moved to the modern building on the main campus of the university.

References
Encyclopædia Iranica: Faculties of the University of Tehran - iv. Faculty of Letters and Humanities

External links
Official Website

University of Tehran
1935 establishments
University of Tehran faculties